Harold James Erickson (July 17, 1919 – February 14, 2008) was an American baseball relief pitcher who played briefly for the Detroit Tigers during the  season.

Early life 
Erickson was born in Portland, Oregon.

Career 
Erickson was a star pitcher with the 1950 Quebec Braves of the Can-Am League, posting a 20–4 record and leading the league in earned run average, strikeouts, and complete games.

Erickson was a 33-year-old rookie when he entered the majors with Detroit in 1953. In 18 relief appearances, he posted a 0–1 record with a 4.73 ERA and one save, giving up 23 runs (17 unearned) on 43 hits and 10 walks while striking out 19 in  innings of work.

Death 
Erickson died in Ogden, Utah, at the age of 88.

External links
, or Retrosheet

References 

Detroit Tigers players
Ogden Reds players
Lewiston Indians players
Major League Baseball pitchers
Baseball players from Oregon
1919 births
2008 deaths
Quebec Braves players
Dallas Eagles players
Syracuse Chiefs players
Buffalo Bisons (minor league) players
St. Paul Saints (AA) players
Columbia Reds players